Chandra Kishore Pathak  (1915 – 2 July 1998) was an Indian politician. He was a Member of Parliament, representing Saharsa, Bihar in the Lok Sabha the lower house of India's Parliament as a member of  the Indian National Congress.

References

External links
Official biographical sketch in Parliament of India website

India MPs 1984–1989
Lok Sabha members from Bihar
Indian National Congress politicians
Indian National Congress politicians from Bihar
1915 births
1998 deaths